The Kentucky Wing of Civil Air Patrol (CAP) is the highest echelon of Civil Air Patrol in the state of Kentucky and is a part of CAP's Great Lakes Region. The Kentucky Wing headquarters is located in Frankfort. The Kentucky Wing consists of over 600 cadet and adult members at 17 locations across the state of Kentucky.

Mission

The Kentucky Wing performs the three primary missions of Civil Air Patrol: providing emergency services; providing a cadet program for youth; and offering aerospace education for both CAP members and the general public.

Emergency services
Providing emergency services includes performing search and rescue and disaster relief missions; as well as assisting in humanitarian aid assignments. The CAP also provides Air Force support through conducting light transport, communications support, and low-altitude route surveys. Civil Air Patrol can also offer support to counter-drug missions.

In January 2009, members of the Kentucky Wing, along with CAP members from the Indiana, Illinois, and Ohio Wings, flew sorties surveying damage and boosting communications for the Kentucky National Guard following a severe ice storm, while CAP ground crews assisted National Guardsmen in going door to door to perform wellness checks on residents.

In April 2015, members of the Kentucky Wing were called to assist the Red Cross to help with victims of flooding that occurred in Louisville, Kentucky. In that same month, they supported the Red Cross for 3 days until their assistance was no longer needed.

From August to September of 2021, Kentucky wing cadets and senior members assisted in a national effort to review disaster relief imagery from the aftermath of hurricane Ida, reviewing hundreds of images and tagging countless structures with their apparent damage level to help determine what areas most critically needed relief efforts focused towards them. 

It may also be noted that members of the Kentucky Wing have been requested by the Governor on several occasions to take surveillance photographs of numerous areas stricken with disasters. These photographs have assisted not only members of the Ground Teams of the Kentucky Wing, but also several other disaster relief teams in knowing where to go first.

Cadet programs
Civil Air Patrol offers cadet programs for youth aged 12 to 21. Cadets receive training in aerospace education, leadership training, physical fitness and moral leadership.

Aerospace education
Civil Air Patrol offers aerospace education for CAP members and the general public; this includes offering training to the members of the CAP, and facilitating teaching workshops for youth through schools and public aviation events.

Organization

Kentucky Civil Air Patrol Wing Commanders

See also
Kentucky Active Militia
Kentucky Air National Guard
Kentucky Army National Guard
United States Coast Guard Auxiliary

References

External links
Kentucky Wing Civil Air Patrol official website

Wings of the Civil Air Patrol
Education in Kentucky
Military in Kentucky
Frankfort, Kentucky
Aviation in Kentucky